Lilian Scharman Hester (née Scharman; June 26, 1901 – March 1, 1982) was an American tennis player who was active in the first half of the 1920s.

Career
She lost to Helen Wills in the first round of Wimbledon in 1924 and competed in the 1924 Summer Olympics. With Francis Hunter she reached the quarterfinal of the Wimbledon mixed doubles event which they lost to Dorothy Shepherd-Barron and Leslie Godfree.

At the 1923 U.S. Women's Clay Court Championships she lost the final of the singles event to Mayme McDonald in three sets. In June 1923 at the New Jersey State Championships, played on clay courts at the Orange Lawn Tennis Club, she won the singles title as well as the doubles title, partnering Ceres Baker. Scharman was a runner-up at the 1924 U.S. Indoor Championships, played at Longwood, Chestnut Hill, losing the final in straight sets to Marion Zinderstein Jessup.

She had a highest national ranking of No.4 in 1923.

Personal life
She was born in Brooklyn, New York on June 26, 1901, the daughter of August Charles Scharman, a businessman, and Lillie Rueger Scharman. Her younger sister Frida (1907–1997) played competitive tennis and squash. In 1921 she graduated from Packer Collegiate Institute. On August 6, 1923 she married William Van Andem Hester jr. in Paris.

Notes

References

External links
 
 
 

1901 births
1982 deaths
American female tennis players
Tennis players at the 1924 Summer Olympics
Olympic tennis players of the United States
Sportspeople from New York City
20th-century American women
20th-century American people
Tennis people from New York (state)